Amado Rigoberto Morales (born July 22, 1947) is a retired male javelin thrower from Puerto Rico, who competed for his native country during the 1970s and the 1980s.

International competitions

References
 1982 Year Ranking
 1976 Results

1947 births
Living people
Place of birth missing (living people)
Puerto Rican male javelin throwers
Olympic track and field athletes of Puerto Rico
Athletes (track and field) at the 1976 Summer Olympics
Pan American Games medalists in athletics (track and field)
Athletes (track and field) at the 1971 Pan American Games
Athletes (track and field) at the 1983 Pan American Games
Pan American Games bronze medalists for Puerto Rico
Central American and Caribbean Games gold medalists for Puerto Rico
Competitors at the 1970 Central American and Caribbean Games
Central American and Caribbean Games medalists in athletics
Medalists at the 1971 Pan American Games
Medalists at the 1983 Pan American Games